Cacatuocotyle is a genus of Monogeneans.

Species
 Cacatuocotyle chajuli Franco, Caspeta-Mandujano & Salgado-Maldanado
 Cacatuocotyle exiguum Franco, Caspeta-Mandujano & Salgado-Maldanado
 Cacatuocotyle paranaensis Boeger, Domingues & Kritsky, 1997

References

External links

Ancyrocephalidae
Monogenea genera